Critical Care Nurse is a bimonthly peer-reviewed nursing journal covering research about bedside care of critically and acutely ill patients and critical and acute care nursing practice. It is published by the American Association of Critical-Care Nurses. The journal was established in 1981 with C. Gozensky and Penny Vaughn as its founding editors-in-chief. Its current editor-in-chief is Annette Bourgault (University of Central Florida).

Abstracting and indexing
The journal is abstracted and indexed in:

According to the Journal Citation Reports, the journal has a 2017 impact factor of 1.707.

References

External links

American Association of Critical-Care Nurses

Critical care nursing journals
Bimonthly journals
English-language journals
Academic journals published by learned and professional societies
Publications established in 1981